Sir John Bingham, 6th Baronet (November 1728 – 27 November 1750) was an Irish politician and baronet.

He was the oldest son of Sir John Bingham, 5th Baronet and his wife Anne Vesey, daughter of Agmondisham Vesey. In 1749, Bingham succeeded his father as baronet as well as Member of Parliament for Mayo, however died already a year later. He died unmarried and was buried in Castlebar. He was succeeded in the baronetcy by his younger brother Charles, later elevated to the Peerage of Ireland as Earl of Lucan.

References

1728 births
1750 deaths
Bingham Baronets, of Castlebar
Irish MPs 1727–1760
Politicians from County Mayo
Members of the Parliament of Ireland (pre-1801) for County Mayo constituencies